Alafia  is a rural commune of the Cercle of Timbuktu in the Tombouctou Region of Mali. The main village and administrative centre is Toya. The commune is mostly desert and covers an area of 27,857 km2. In the 2009 census the commune had a population of 13,318.

References

Communes of Tombouctou Region